
Gmina Bedlno is a rural gmina (administrative district) in Kutno County, Łódź Voivodeship, in central Poland.

Villages
Gmina Bedlno contains the villages and settlements of Annetów, Antoniew, Bedlno, Czarnów, Dębowa Góra, Ernestynów, Florianów, Garbów, Głuchów, Gosławice, Groszki, Janów, Jaroszówka, Józefów, Kamilew, Karolew, Kaźmierek, Konstantynów, Kręcieszki, Kujawki, Mateuszew, Nowe Bedlno, Nowy Franciszków, Orłów, Orłów-Kolonia, Orłów-Parcel, Plecka Dąbrowa, Pniewo, Potok, Ruszki, Stanisławice, Stradzew, Szewce Nadolne, Szewce Nagórne, Szewce Owsiane, Szewce-Walentyna, Tomczyce, Waliszew, Wewiórz, Wilkęsy, Wojszyce, Wola Kałkowa, Wyrów, Załusin, Żeronice, Zleszyn and Zosinów.

Neighbouring gminas
Gmina Bedlno is bordered by the gminas of Bielawy, Krzyżanów, Oporów, Piątek, Zduny and Żychlin.

References
 Polish official population figures 2006

Bedlno
Kutno County